Emeline Gros (born 19 August, 1995) is a French rugby union player who plays for FC Grenoble Amazones and the France women's national rugby union team.

Personal life
Gros qualified as a nurse in July 2019. For the COVID-19 pandemic she worked full time in a nursing home in Isère.

Career
Gros played for FC Grenoble Amazones from 2013 and won the Elite 2 championships in 2018 before joining Montpellier Hérault Rugby in 2020 for two seasons before returning to FC Grenoble Amazones in 2022.

She made her French debut in November 2017 against Spain, and in July 2019 she scored her country's first try against the United States.

She was named in France's team for the delayed 2021 Rugby World Cup in New Zealand.

References

1995 births
Living people
French female rugby union players